The 2022 USA Indoor Track and Field Championships were held at The Podium in Spokane, Washington. Organized by USA Track and Field (USATF), the two-day competition took place from February 26 to February 27 and served as the national championships in track and field for the United States and selection meet for Team USA for 2022 World Athletics Indoor Championships March 18 to 20, 2022 in Belgrade, Serbia.

Male Track medalist

Male Field medalist

Female Track medalist

Female Field medalist

Qualification

The 2022 USA Indoor Track and Field Championships serve as the qualification meet for United States representatives in international competitions, including the 2022 World Athletics Indoor Championships from 18 to 20 March 2022 in Belgrade, Serbia. In order to be entered, athletes need to achieve a qualifying standard mark and place in the top 2 in their event and top 12 in the world. The United States team, as managed by USATF, can also bring a qualified back up athlete in case one of the team members is unable to perform.

Additionally, defending 2021 World Athletics Indoor Tour Winner (received a wildcard spot subject to ratification by their country) and World Champions received byes into the 2022 World Championships. The athletes eligible for a bye are:

Defending World Champions
 Courtney Okolo - 400 m
 Will Claye - Triple Jump
 Christian Coleman - 60 m
 Kendra Harrison - 60 m hurdles
 Sandi Morris - Pole Vault

Defending World Tour Winner
 Javianne Oliver - 60 m
 Grant Holloway - 60 m hurdles

Schedule

Entry Standards
Events in bold will be contested at the Championships.

January 1, 2021 – February 13, 2022 window.

References

External links
 2022 USATF Indoor Track and Field Championships Home Page
 Temporary 2022 USATF Indoor Track and Field Championship Results

2022
Track and field indoor
USA Indoor Track and Field Championships
USA Indoor Track and Field Championships
Sports competitions in Spokane, Washington
Track and field in Washington (state)